Logistics UK, formerly the Freight Transport Association (FTA) is one of the largest trade associations in the UK, with members moving goods by road, rail, sea, and air. Its mission is to represent the views and interests of over 18,000 companies from the transport industry: from large multinationals and household names to small and medium businesses. Logistics UK is based in Tunbridge Wells.

Logistics UK policy is decided by its members from all modes, through its quarterly regional and national councils. National Councils comprise the British Shippers Council, the Rail Freight Council, the Road Freight Council, and the Freight Council.

Logistics UK also provides members with services that help them to operate safely, efficiently, and in an environmentally sustainable way.

History

Following the 1888 Railway and Canal Traffic Act traders were given a right of complaint to the Board of Trade if they felt that railway rates or services were unreasonable. That resulted in an influential group of traders coming together in July 1889 and creating an organisation called the Mansion House Association on Railway Rates. Amongst its first members were Mr J J Colman of Reckitt & Colman, and a Mr Thomas Blackwell of Crosse and Blackwell.

The arrival of the internal combustion engine led to the formation in 1904 of the Motor Van and Wagon Users' Association, which changed its name to the Commercial Motor Users' Union in 1907.

In 1921 the third and final segment of the then FTA was formed - the Traders' Co-ordinating Committee on Transport.

Over the years the work of the Mansion House Association expanded into more road orientated matters and in 1931 changing its name to the Mansion House Association on Transport.

In 1944 the Commercial Motor Users' Association decided that each of its constituent sectors needed its own identity and was reformed into three organisations. The own-account sector became the Traders' Road Transport Association.

In 1964 the Mansion House Association changed its name to the National Traders' Traffic Association and finally, in 1969, the three groups - the Traders' Road Transport Association, the Traders' Traffic Association and the Traders' Co-ordinating Committee - joined together to become the Freight Transport Association.

In 1979 the group was further strengthened when the British Shippers' Council representing exporters and importers, became a part of FTA.

In 2020, the FTA rebranded itself as Logistics UK. 

The rebrand was a strategic exercise, aimed at increasing public awareness of the work that the (formerly) FTA carried out and the interests they represented. It was felt that major news organisations and broadcast media favoured the Road Haulage Association (RHA), a competitor trade organisation, when seeking comment on a related story and that part of the reason behind this was the lack of clarity behind the interests represented by the FTA as it was known at the time.

Research
Logistics UK conducts research and produces in-depth reports on a variety of sectors affecting the logistics industry, which are distributed to members, legislators and policy makers. Of particular note is the annual Logistics Report, which provides a comprehensive overview of the sector, as well as containing research results from member organisations on a number of topics.  In addition, the business group produces an annual Skills Report, which examines the recruitment situation across the industry, as well as the Quarterly Transport Activity Survey, which is increasingly used by government and the public policy arena as an economic performance indicator.

Campaign for Safe Road Design
In July 2008 the FTA became a partner in the Campaign for Safe Road Design which called on the UK government to make safe road design a national transport priority.

References

External links 
 Logistics UK

Transport organisations based in the United Kingdom
Road transport in the United Kingdom
Freight transport
Organisations based in Kent
Royal Tunbridge Wells
1889 establishments in the United Kingdom
Organizations established in 1889
Lobbying organisations in the United Kingdom